Anetia is a Neotropical genus of nymphalid butterflies in the Danainae subfamily.

Species
 Lesser false fritillary (Anetia briarea)
 Salvin's anetia (Anetia cubana)
 Jaeger's anetia (Anetia jaegeri)
 False fritillary (Anetia pantheratus)
 Cloud-forest monarch (Anetia thirza) (Geyer, [1833])

References

 
Danaini
Nymphalidae of South America
Nymphalidae genera
Taxa named by Jacob Hübner
Taxonomy articles created by Polbot